Douglas Brian Berndt (born September 10, 1949, in Denver, Colorado; died February 2, 1995, in Denver) was an American figure skater.  He competed in pairs with partner Barbara Brown.  The duo twice won the bronze medal at the U.S. Figure Skating Championships and competed in the 1972 Winter Olympics.

Following his skating career, Berndt was a flight attendant with United Airlines.

Results
(pairs with Barbara Brown)

References
Sports-Reference.com

American male pair skaters
Olympic figure skaters of the United States
Figure skaters at the 1972 Winter Olympics
1949 births
1995 deaths
20th-century American people